Bashir Humphreys (born 15 March 2003) is an English professional footballer who plays as a defender for  club Paderborn 07, on loan from Chelsea.

Club career
Born in Exeter, Humphreys played in the youth setup of Reading before a stint in grassroots football. He signed for Chelsea at under-15 level, going on to sign a scholarship deal in 2019. He signed his first professional contract with Chelsea in October 2021, going on to extend this deal the following year.

He was named on the bench for the first time ahead of a Premier League fixture against Bournemouth in December 2022, but did not feature. His Chelsea debut came in the FA Cup third round on 8 January 2023, after being named in the starting eleven against Manchester City.

On 27 January 2023, Humphreys joined 2. Bundesliga club SC Paderborn on loan until the end of the season.

International career
Humphreys has represented England at under-16 and under-19 level.

Career statistics

Club

Honours 
England U19
 UEFA European Under-19 Championship: 2022

References

2003 births
Living people
Sportspeople from Exeter
English footballers
England youth international footballers
English people of Ugandan descent
Association football defenders
Reading F.C. players
Chelsea F.C. players
SC Paderborn 07 players
English expatriate footballers
English expatriate sportspeople in Germany
Expatriate footballers in Germany